John August Michaelson (August 12, 1893 – April 16, 1968) was a professional baseball pitcher. He appeared in two games in Major League Baseball in 1921 for the Chicago White Sox. As of 2023, he is the only major league player to have been born in Finland.

References

External links

Major League Baseball pitchers
Chicago White Sox players
Finnish baseball players
People from Taivalkoski
1893 births
1968 deaths
Major League Baseball players from Finland
Sportspeople from North Ostrobothnia